The Mayor's Cup is the rivalry between the Temple Owls and the Villanova Wildcats. The two schools are located 15 miles apart from each other in the Philadelphia, Pennsylvania area. The two teams have met 35 times on the football field, Villanova leads the series 17–16–2.

Game results

See also  
 List of NCAA college football rivalry games

References

College football rivalry trophies in the United States
Temple Owls football
Villanova Wildcats football